Salt-concrete (or salzbeton) is a building material that is used to reduce the water inflow in mining shafts in salt mines. It is composed of 16% cement, 39% halite, 16% limestone powder, 14% water and 15% sand.

History
Salt-concrete was used for the first time in 1984 in the potash mine in Rocanville in Canada. A salt-concrete seal was also installed in the Asse II mine  in Lower Saxony in 1995.

Filling tunnels
Since the end of the repository for radioactive waste Morsleben in 1998, the salt dome stability deteriorated to a state where it could collapse. Since 2003, a volume of  m3 of salt-concrete has been pumped into the pit to temporarily stabilize the upper levels. In addition another  m3 of salt-concrete will be used to temporarily stabilize the lower levels.

See also
 Friedel's salt
 synthesized first by Georges Friedel
 Sorel cement
 produced first by Stanislas Sorel
Saltcrete

References

Cement
Concrete
Salts
Underground mining